Brindabella is a maxi yacht. It won line honours in the  1997 Sydney to Hobart Yacht Race as well as breaking the race record for a conventionally ballasted yacht in 1999.

Described as "Australia’s most famous maxi" and "The people's maxi". She was designed by Scott Jutson in 1993 under the IMS handicap system as a 75 foot maxi and later underwent structural changes including the addition of a bow sprit, and a "scoop" transom.

She has broken many records of races continuing and discontinued, some of which are the Sydney to Hobart record for a conventionally ballasted yacht (1999), the Sydney to Wollongong race, Bird island, Cabbage Tree Island, Sydney Noumea, Sydney Moolooolaba, and Sydney Gold Coast races.

Brindabella is now owned by John Hilhorst and Brigid Dighton in Adelaide, where she is used as a charter vessel.

References

Maxi yachts
1990s sailing yachts
Sailing yachts built in Australia
Sydney to Hobart Yacht Race yachts
Sailboat type designs by Bruce Farr